The Alphonso mango is a named mango cultivar that originated in India.

Origin
The variety is named after Afonso de Albuquerque, a distinguished militarian and viceroy of Portuguese India from 1509 to 1515. Jesuit missionaries introduced grafting on mango trees in Portuguese Goa, to produce varieties like Alphonso. In 1563, Garcia da Orta wrote of Alphonsos grown in Portuguese Bombay, which were to be presented to the governor (viceroy) in Goa. Alphonso is also one of the most expensive varieties of mango, and is grown mainly in the Konkan region of western India. and also grown in Valsad and Navsari district of south Gujarat.

Description

The Alphonso mango is a seasonal fruit harvested from mid-April through the end of June. The time from flowering to harvest is about 90 days, while the time from harvest to ripening is about 15 days. As the fruit matures, the skin of an Alphonso mango turns golden-yellow with a tinge of red across the top of the fruit.

Culinary
Mango sorbet, ice cream, lassi, soufflé, mousse, and puree are some culinary preparations using Alphonso mangoes.

Trade
The Alphonso is prized in domestic and international markets for its taste, fragrance and vibrant color. It is exported to various countries, including Japan, Korea and Europe.

Import bans 
An import ban imposed in 1989 by the United States on Indian mangoes, including the Alphonso, was lifted in April 2007. However, the mangoes needed to be treated before entering the country in order to stop the introduction of non-native fruit flies, destructive fungi, and other pests that could harm American agriculture. The European Union imposed a ban beginning in April 2014 on import of mangoes after finding "non-European fruit flies" in some consignments, creating a significant threat to UK salad crops. The Indian government had described this decision as arbitrary and businesses claimed they would suffer financial losses due to the ban.

In January 2015, the European Commission lifted the ban following significant improvements in the Indian mango export system.

References

Mango cultivars of India
Flora of India (region)
Economy of Maharashtra
Ratnagiri district